WRFH-LP (101.7 FM, "Radio Free Hillsdale 101.7 FM") is a radio station licensed to serve the community of Hillsdale, Michigan. The station is owned by Hillsdale College and airs a news/talk format.

The station was assigned the call sign WDLH-LP by the Federal Communications Commission on March 5, 2014. The station changed its call sign to WRFH-LP fifteen days later.

References

External links
 Official Website
 FCC Public Inspection File for WRFH-LP
 

RFH-LP
RFH-LP
Radio stations established in 2015
2015 establishments in Michigan
News and talk radio stations in the United States
Hillsdale College
Hillsdale County, Michigan